Hermann Schüller (1893–1948) was a German writer and Communist activist. He was one of the founders of the League for Proletarian Culture in 1919. In October 1920, with Erwin Piscator he founded the Proletarian Theatre, Stage of the Revolutionary Workers of Greater Berlin.

Räte-Zeitung
In 1919 Schüller wrote for the Räte-Zeitung. He also produced a series of pamphlets called Der Aufbau: Flugblätter an Jugend. Three of these were written by himself. Hans Reichenbach contributed Volume 5 Student und Sozialismus.

Der Aufbau: Flugblätter an Jugend
Der Aufbau: Flugblätter an Jugend (Constructure: Pamphlets for Youth) was a series of pamphlets produced by Schüller:
 Revolution - Aufbau by Hermann Schüller 6pp
 Der Bund Aufbau by Hermann Schüller 6pp
 Die Freie Hochschulgemeinde by Hermann Schüller 6pp
 Die Hochschulgemeinde : die Ideologie eines Hochschulprogramms aufgestellt von der Freien Hochschulgemeinde Marburg by Hermann Schüller 11pp
 Student und Sozialismus : mit einem Anhang: Programm der Sozialistischen Studentenpartei by Hans Reichenbach 7pp
 Erweckung der Universität by Hinrich Knittermeyer 11pp
 Zur Erneuerung der Geschichtswissenschaft by Walther Koch 10pp
 Erziehung zur Gemeinschaft  by H. G. Nathansohn, 6pp
  ?
 Die aufbauende Gemeinschaft by Fritz Klatt, 10pp

Works
 "Proletkult Proletarisches Theater", Der Gegener, Volume 1, Number 4, August 1920

References

1893 births
1948 deaths
20th-century German writers